Abhishek Pallava (born 2 September 1982) is an IPS officer. 
He is the Superintendent of Police of Dantewada district of Chhattisgarh, India which is a Left Wing Extremism affected area. Pallava is an IPS officer of 2013 Batch. 
He has been working in the field of policing for last four years after leaving his medical practice.

Police career

Mr. Pallava was appointed as the SP of Dantewada district this year. 
He came to limelight when He treated a maoist whom he himself had shot at.
 He also treats ailing people of interior villages.

Early life

Abhishek Pallava was born to Mr.  Rishi Kumar and Mrs. Asha Devi in Begusarai. He joined Indian Police Service in 2013 through Civil Service Examination.

Personal life

He is married to Dr. Yasha Upendra. She is a Dantewada-based doctor.

References 

1982 births
Living people
21st-century Indian medical doctors
Indian Police Service officers